The Twenty-fourth Amendment of the Constitution of India, officially known as The Constitution (Twenty-fourth Amendment) Act, 1971, enables Parliament to dilute Fundamental Rights through Amendments of the Constitution. It also amended article 368 to provide expressly that Parliament has power to amend any provision of the Constitution. The amendment further made it obligatory for the President to give his assent, when a Constitution Amendment Bill was presented to him.

The 24th Amendment was enacted, by the Congress government headed by Indira Gandhi, to abrogate the Supreme Court ruling in Golaknath v. State of Punjab. The judgement reversed the Supreme Court's earlier decision which had upheld Parliament's power to amend all parts of the Constitution, including Part III related to Fundamental Rights. The judgement left Parliament with no power to curtail Fundamental Rights. To abrogate the ruling, the government intended to amend article 368 to provide expressly that Parliament has power to amend any provision of the Constitution, thereby bringing Fundamental Rights within the scope of its amending procedure, and preventing review of those changes by the courts.

The 24th Amendment came into force on 5 November 1971. The Indian press characterised the 24th Amendment as being too sweeping in its ambit, and of dubious legality. The Amendment was also opposed by jurists, and all  the surviving members of the Constituent Assembly at the time. The Supreme Court upheld the validity of the 24th Amendment in Kesavananda Bharati v. State of Kerala in 1973.

Text

The full text of article 13, after the 24th Amendment, is given below:

The full text of article 368, after the 24th Amendment, is given below:

Background

The 24th Amendment was effected to abrogate the Supreme Court ruling in Golaknath v. State of Punjab. The Supreme Court delivered its ruling, by a majority of 6-5 on 27 February 1967. The Court held that an amendment of the Constitution is a legislative process, and that an amendment under article 368 is "law" within the meaning of article 13 of the Constitution and therefore, if an amendment "takes away or abridges" a Fundamental Right conferred by Part III, it is void. Article 13(2) reads, "The State shall not make any law which takes away or abridges the right conferred by this Part and any law made in contravention of this clause shall, to the extent of contravention, be void." The Court also ruled that Fundamental Rights included in Part III of the Constitution are given a "transcendental position" under the Constitution and are kept beyond the reach of Parliament. The Court also held that the scheme of the Constitution and the nature of the freedoms it granted incapacitated Parliament from modifying, restricting or impairing Fundamental Freedoms in Part III.

The judgment reversed the Supreme Court's earlier decision which had upheld Parliament's power to amend all parts of the Constitution, including Part III related to Fundamental Rights. The judgement left Parliament with no power to curtail Fundamental Rights. To abrogate the ruling, the government intended to amend article 368 to provide expressly that Parliament has power to amend any provision of the Constitution, thereby bringing Fundamental Rights within the scope of its amending procedure.

Proposal and enactment
The Constitution (Twenty-fourth Amendment) Bill, 1971 (Bill No. 105 of 1971) was introduced in the Lok Sabha on 28 July 1971 by H.R. Gokhale, then Minister of Law and Justice. The Bill sought to amend articles 13 and 368 of the Constitution. The full text of the Statement of Objects and Reasons appended to the bill is given below:

The Bill was considered by the Lok Sabha on 3 and 4 August, and passed, in the original form, on 4 August 1971. While moving the bill for consideration in the Lok Sabha, Gokhale stated that the fear that Parliament would "misuse the power to curtail Fundamental Rights once it acquired the power to amend them, was unfounded." Gokhale further stated that Directive Principles must prevail over Fundamental Rights, in case of conflict between the two.

Union Education Minister Siddhartha Shankar Ray stated that allowing judgements like that in the Golaknath case would have "disastrous consequences". Congress member Darbara Singh felt that "the attitude of the Supreme Court must change with the times". A.K. Gopalan, leader of the Communist Party (Marxist) (CPM), supported the bill during the debate in the Lok Sabha on 3 August. Gopalan stated that the present Constitution was a "bundle of contradictions" drawn up by "representatives of princely houses and big business".

In response to critics of the amendment, Prime Minister Indira Gandhi stated, "we are committed to the upholding of the fundamental freedom - of assembly and of worship - and our commitment to secular democracy is non-negotiable".

The Bill, as passed by the Lok Sabha, was considered by the Rajya Sabha on 10 and 11 August and passed on 11 August 1971. The debate in the Rajya Sabha was brief.

The bill received assent from then President Varahagiri Venkata Giri on 5 November 1971. It was notified in The Gazette of India and came into force on the same day.

Ratification
The Act was passed in accordance with the provisions of Article 368 of the Constitution, and was ratified by more than half of the State Legislatures, as required under Clause (2) of the said article. State Legislatures that ratified the amendment are listed below:

 Andhra Pradesh
 Haryana
 Himachal Pradesh
 Jammu and Kashmir
 Kerala
 Madhya Pradesh
 Maharashtra
 Nagaland
 Tamil Nadu
 Uttar Pradesh
 West Bengal

Did not ratify:
 Assam
 Bihar
 Gujarat
 Mysore
 Orissa
 Punjab
 Rajasthan

Reception
The Hindu, in its editorial on 6 August 1971, stated, "All change and growth whether political or biological, have to conform to the basic laws of their province, or otherwise such growth would soon be found to be cancerous and self destructive. And even if certain urgently needed socio-economic changes call for a cribbling and cabining of the right property, the sweeping power conferred on Parliament by the 24th Amendment to tamper with all the rights, including the right to freedom of association and of religion, are such that it is not surprising that some leaders of minorities and some 'committed' socialists have been alarmed over the grim possibilities." In a 1971 editorial on the amendment, The Statesman wrote, "The implications are breath-taking. Parliament now has the power to deny the seven freedoms, abolish Constitutional remedies available to citizens, and to change the federal character of the Union."

Legal expert V. G. Ramachandran, writing in the Supreme Court Cases Journal in 1971, stated that the 24th and 25th Amendments were "not 'tinkering' with the Constitution. It is a veritable slaughter of the Constitution". He felt that the 25th Amendment "smacks of totalitarianism and hurry to achieve socialism instantly overnight".

Mahommedali Currim Chagla, former Chief Justice of the Bombay High Court, opposed the 24th Amendment. Former Attorney-General M.C. Setalvad described the 24th Amendment as "a complete negation of the rule of law", and stressed that apart from its effect on the Indian people, the amendment endangered government itself. Renowned jurists Kasturiranga Santhanam and Nanabhoy Palkhivala also opposed the amendment. The 24th Amendment was also opposed by B. Shiva Rao, Frank Anthony and all surviving members of the Constituent Assembly.

The 24th Amendment received little attention from the general public at the time of its enactment, as their attention was focused on tense relations between India and Pakistan due to the ongoing Bangladesh Liberation War, which later led to the Indo-Pakistani War of 1971.

Aftermath
The 24th Amendment was the first of a series of measures taken by Indira Gandhi to increase her power, and establish one-party rule. It was followed by several constitutional amendments designed to weaken the judiciary, and enhance the authority of Parliament and the Prime Minister's Office. The most notable among these were the 25th, 38th and 39th Amendments, culminating in the 42nd Amendment in 1976 during The Emergency, which brought about the most sweeping changes to the Constitution in history.

Kesavananda Bharati case

The Supreme Court reviewed its decision in Golaknath v. State of Punjab, in 1971 in Kesavananda Bharati v. State of Kerala, and considered the validity of the 24th, 25th, 26th and 29th Amendments. The case was heard by the largest ever Constitutional Bench of 13 Judges. The Bench gave eleven judgements, which agreed on some points and differed on others. The Court held, by a margin of 7-6, that although no part of the Constitution, including Fundamental Rights, was beyond the amending power of Parliament (thus overruling the 1967 case), the "basic structure of the Constitution could not be abrogated even by a constitutional amendment".

The Court upheld Section 2(a) and 2(b), and the first part of section 3 of the 25th Amendment as valid. However, the second part namely "and no law containing a declaration that it is for giving effect to such policy shall be called in question in any court on the ground that it does not give effect to such policy" was declared unconstitutional.

The government of Indira Gandhi did not take kindly to this implied restriction on its powers by the court. On 26 April 1973, Justice Ajit Nath Ray, who was among the dissenters, was promoted to Chief Justice of India superseding three senior Judges, Shelat, Grover and Hegde, which was unprecedented in Indian legal history. Advocate C.K. Daphtary termed the incident as "the blackest day in the history of democracy". Justice Mohammad Hidayatullah (previous Chief Justice of India) remarked that "this was an attempt of not creating 'forward looking judges' but 'judges looking forward' to the office of Chief Justice".

The government enacted the 42nd Amendment in 1976, to abrogate the Kesavananda Bharati ruling

See also
Basic structure doctrine
List of amendments of the Constitution of India

References

24
1971 in India
1971 in law
Indira Gandhi administration